Rise is the tenth album by the Finnish rock band The Rasmus, released on 23 September 2022. It is their first album after five years of inactivity, as a continuation of their previous album Dark Matters (2017).

Background
Following the Dark Matters tour, the band held a series of concerts to celebrate the 15th anniversary of the release of their breakthrough album Dead Letters. Before the outbreak of the COVID-19 pandemic, they released the heavily pop-influenced "Holy Grail". Subsequently, two more songs were released during the pandemic, "Bones" in early 2021 and "Venomous Moon" at the end of the year, another collaboration with Apocalyptica. They have previously collaborated on "Life Burns!" and "Bittersweet".

At the beginning of 2022, the band's founder and lead guitarist Pauli Rantasalmi announced his departure. Emilia "Emppu" Suhonen was announced as his replacement, adding a female member to the line-up. The band later competed in the Eurovision Song Contest 2022 with "Jezebel", after winning the Finnish national selection. At Eurovision, the band qualified for the final by finishing in 7th place in their semi-final, and ultimately finished in 21st place. According to the band's fans, "Jezebel" is reminiscent of the band's peak of popularity between 2003 and 2008, which they attributed to the involvement of producer Desmond Child, with whom the Black Roses album was recorded in 2008. The album's title track, "Rise", was released on 10 June 2022.

Track listing

Personnel
The Rasmus
 Lauri Ylönen – vocals
 Eero Heinonen – bass
 Emppu Suhonen – guitars
 Pauli Rantasalmi - guitars
 Aki Hakala – drums

Charts

References

2022 albums
The Rasmus albums